Julie's Haircut is an Italian neo-psychedelic rock group formed in Emilia between Modena and Reggio Emilia in 1994. They sing in English.

Biography
Active since the late nineties, Julie's Haircut is a band originally formed in Sassuolo, northern Italy. Their debut album “Fever in the funk house” (Gammapop, 1999), a strange mixture of garage rock, noisy psychedelia and pop melodies was hailed at by the critics as one of the best debuts in Italian indie rock and was included in the top 50 Italian albums of the 90's by the magazine Rumore. The follow-up “Stars never looked so bright” (Gammapop, 2001) mixed these elements with a more soulful approach, mirroring the love for 60's black music nurtured by the band. In 2003, after switching to Homesleep Records Julie's Haircut released their third album “Adult situations”, the first to be internationally distributed. Here, melody and odd psychedelia mingle in a more personal way. By 2005 the music of Julie's Haircut has moved towards more experimental grounds, focusing on improv and sound research, without losing touch with the groove and melody that characterized their music since day one. The result is their fourth album “After dark, my sweet” (Homesleep, 2006), featuring former Spacemen 3 Sonic Boom, acclaimed as one of the best alternative Italian albums of the year and included in the top 20 psychedelic Italian albums of all time by the magazine Il Mucchio. In 2006 they also functioned as “sound carriers” for some performances of former Can singer Damo Suzuki, thus entering the Damo Suzuki Network and consolidating a warm and ongoing relationship with the Japanese/German artist. The collaboration with Sonic Boom also resulted in the release, in 2007, of the EP "N-Waves/U-Waves", including studio jams with the English musician. In 2009 the double album "Our Secret Ceremony" was released by A Silent Place. A new 10” single, featuring cover versions of Alejandro Jodorowsky’s The Tarot, from “The Holy Mountain” soundtrack and Nino Rota’s O Venezia Venaga Venusia, from the "Fellini’s Casanova” soundtrack, was released in June 2011. In June 2012 the ep "The Wildlife Variations" was released through Woodworm Music & Trovarobato. In 2012 the band has begun a collaboration with the American Fluxus composer Philip Corner, resulting in a live performance in Reggio Emilia, a recording of Corner's music under the direction of the composer and a sound installation featured in the exhibition "Women in Fluxus and other experimental tales" held at Palazzo Magnani in Reggio Emilia. In 2013 their instrumental album “Ashram Equinox” was released, followed one year later by a digital-only release of a deluxe edition including various outtakes and remixes. In 2017 the album ”Invocation And Ritual Dance Of My Demon Twin” was released for the British label Rocket Recordings, followed by the standalone digital single "Burning Tree". In 2019 their sophomore album for the English label, "In the Silence Electric", is released.

Discography

LP
1999 - Fever in the Funk House, Gamma Pop
2001 - Stars Never Looked So Bright, Gamma Pop
2003 - Adult Situations, Homesleep/Sony
2006 - After Dark My Sweet, Homesleep/Audioglobe
2009 - Our Secret Ceremony, A Silent Place
2013 - Ashram Equinox, Woodworm/Santeria/Crash Symbols
2017 - Invocation And Ritual Dance Of My Demon Twin, Rocket Recordings
2019 - Music from The Last Command, 42 Records
2019 - In The Silence Electric, Rocket Recordings

EP & Singles

1998 - I'm in Love with Someone Older Than Me 7-inch single, Gamma Pop
1999 - Everyone Needs Someone to Fuck 7-inch single, Gamma Pop/Superlove
2000 - I Wanna Be a Pop Rock Star! - The Plague of Alternative Rock CD, Gamma pop/Superlove
2001 - Everything Is Alright CD single, Gamma Pop/Superlove
2001 - Set the World on Fire CD single, Gamma Pop/Superlove
2001 - The Black Christmas EP CD single, Gamma Pop/Superlove
2003 - The Power of Psychic Revenge CD, Homesleep
2004 - Marmalade(EP), remix collection CD, Homesleep
2005 - Julie's Haircut/Judah split 7-inch single, Black Candy/Superlove
2007 - Julie's Haircut with Sonic Boom: N-Waves / U-Waves 10-inch/CD EP, A Silent Place/Superlove
2009 - Julie's Haircut with Mariposa: Concerto Grosso tour gift CD-R, givaway on the tour "Concerto Grosso"
2011 - Julie's Haircut play Jodorowsky & Rota 10-inch, Gamma Pop/Ghost Records/Superlove
2012 - The Wildlife Variations 12-inch, WoodWorm/Trovarobato/Superlove
2012 - Dark Leopards of the Moon, remix collection digital single, Superlove
2013 - Downtown Love Tragedies (pt. 1 & 2) split 7-inch single with Cut, Gamma Pop
2015 - Sidesteps split 12-inch single with Sendelica, Fruits de Mer Records
2018 - Burning Tree digital single, Rocket Recordings
2018 - Karlsruhe/Fountain 12-inch single, Superlove
2020 - Jihang/Orpheus Rising split digital single with Rainbow Island, Superlove

Line-up
 Nicola Caleffi: guitars, keyboards, percussions, bass, vocals (1994–present)
 Luca Giovanardi: guitars, keyboards, bass, electronics, vocals (1994–present)
 Andrea Rovacchi: keyboards, percussions (2006–present)
 Andrea Scarfone: guitars, bass (2005–present)
 Ulisse Tramalloni: drums, percussions (2010–present)

Ex Members
 Laura Storchi: bass, keyboards, vocals (1994-2005)
 Giancarlo Frigieri: drums, percussion (1995-1997)
 Rev. Fabio Vecchi: rhodes, organ, synth (2000-2005)
 Roberto Morselli: drums, percussion (1997-2010)
 Laura Sghedoni: bass, vocals (2006-2007)
 Mara Mariani: bass, vocals (2007)
 Laura Agnusdei: alto and tenor saxophones (2015-2020)

External links
 Official website

Italian rock music groups
Italian indie rock groups
Italian progressive rock groups
Italian post-rock groups
Musical groups established in 1994
1994 establishments in Italy
Fruits de Mer Records artists